Danish Renzu is an Indian born Los Angeles based film director, producer, and screenwriter. He is also the Founder of Renzu Films. Renzu is best known for directing and producing films like Half Widow, The illegal, and Songs of Paradise featuring Saba Azad, Soni Razdan, Lillete Dubey, among others.

Renzu has received numerous accolades, his film The illegal as a writer and director was shortlisted for nominations for the Best Picture Category at the Academy Awards 2019.

Early life and education
Danish Renzu was born in Kashmir, India. In 2005, he shifted to Los Angeles for further studies, where he graduated from the University of California, Los Angeles. He holds a degree in Electrical Engineering and UCLA Writers' Program certification in screenwriting from the same University.

Career
Renzu started directing short movies in 2015. He directed two short films In Search of America, Inshallah (2014) and First Love (2015). His first feature film Half Widow was released in 2017 and narrates the story of a woman searching for her husband against the backdrop of the Kargil War. His second directorial film was The illegal (2019) starring Suraj Sharma of Oscar-winning film Life of Pi, Shweta Tripathi, and Adil Hussain. The film was shortlisted for nominations for the Best Picture Category at the Academy Awards 2019.

He also directed and produced the music video Ae Savere starring Soni Razdan. His recent short film The Good News is streaming on Disney+ Hotstar.

Filmography

Awards and recognition

References

External links 

 

Living people
Indian film directors
Film producers from Jammu and Kashmir
Year of birth missing (living people)